Vympel is a rural locality (a settlement) in Bezrukavsky Selsoviet, Rubtsovsky District, Altai Krai, Russia. The population was 162 as of 2013. There are 6 streets.

Geography 
Vympel is located 7 km east of Rubtsovsk (the district's administrative centre) by road. Kalinovka is the nearest rural locality.

References 

Rural localities in Rubtsovsky District